

Old Time Greats is a two-disc compilation album by American rock group Lynyrd Skynyrd. Released in 1997, it documents the original 1970s run of the band before the 1977 Convair 240 crash that killed Ronnie Van Zant, Steve Gaines, Cassie Gaines, assistant road manager Dean Kilpatrick, pilot Walter McCreary, and co-pilot William Gray.

The album is released by Repertoire Records out of Hamburg, Germany. It is only available in the United States as an import.

Track listing
The tracks are from 1971 to 1977. The first four tracks on CD 1 are early recordings from 1971–72 that were originally later released on Best of the Rest in 1982 (1990 on CD) and Skynyrd's First and... Last from 1978 respectively. Those songs were recorded at Muscle Shoals Sound Studio for what was originally planned to be the band's shelved debut album, making (Pronounced 'Lĕh-'nérd 'Skin-'nérd) their official debut. The remaining tracks on the album are in chronological order starting with songs from (Pronounced 'Lĕh-'nérd 'Skin-'nérd) in 1973 and concludes with songs from Street Survivors in 1977.

Disc one
"I've Been Your Fool" (Allen Collins, Gary Rossington, Ronnie Van Zant) – 4:28
"Comin' Home" (Collins, Van Zant) – 5:30
"Down South Jukin'" (Rossington, Van Zant) – 2:14
"White Dove" (Rickey Medlocke) – 2:58
"I Ain't the One" (Rossington, Van Zant) – 3:54
"Tuesday's Gone" (Collins, Van Zant) – 7:33
"Gimme Three Steps" (Collins, Van Zant) – 4:30
"Simple Man" (Rossington, Van Zant) – 5:57
"Poison Whiskey" (Ed King, Van Zant) – 3:12
"Free Bird" (Collins, Van Zant) – 9:11
"Sweet Home Alabama" (King, Rossington, Van Zant) – 4:45
"Don't Ask Me No Questions" (Rossington, Van Zant) – 3:26
"Workin' for MCA" (King, Van Zant) – 4:49
"Swamp Music" (King, Van Zant) – 3:33
"The Needle and the Spoon" (Collins, Van Zant) – 3:52

Disc two
"Call Me the Breeze" (J. J. Cale) – 5:08
"Saturday Night Special" (King, Van Zant) – 5:09
"Railroad Song" (King, Van Zant) – 4:15
"I'm a Country Boy" (Collins, Van Zant) – 4:26
"On the Hunt" (Collins, Van Zant) – 5:27
"Whiskey Rock-a-Roller" (King, Billy Powell, Van Zant) – 4:20
"Gimme Back My Bullets" (Rossington, Van Zant) – 3:29
"(I Got The) Same Old Blues" (Cale) – 4:09
"Double Trouble" (Collins, Van Zant) – 2:50
"Searchin'" (Collins, Van Zant) – 3:18
"Cry for the Bad Man" (Rossington, Collins, Van Zant) – 4:50
"What's Your Name?" (Rossington, Van Zant) – 3:33
"That Smell" (Collins, Van Zant) – 5:48
"I Know a Little" (Steve Gaines) – 3:28
"You Got That Right" (Gaines, Van Zant) – 3:47

Disc 1, track 1 from Best of the Rest (1982)
Disc 1, tracks 2–4 from Skynyrd's First and... Last (1978)
Disc 1, tracks 5–10 from (Pronounced 'Lĕh-'nérd 'Skin-'nérd) (1973)
Disc 1, tracks 11–15 and disc 2, track 1 from Second Helping (1974)
Disc 2, tracks 2–6 from Nuthin' Fancy (1975)
Disc 2, tracks 7–11 from Gimme Back My Bullets (1976)
Disc 2, tracks 12–15 from Street Survivors (1977)

References

External links
 www.angelfire.com/tn/LSkynyrd/disco3.html

1997 greatest hits albums
Lynyrd Skynyrd compilation albums